Ken Schilz (born January 17, 1969) is an American politician who was a member of the unicameral  Nebraska Legislature. 
He was born in and resides in Ogallala, Nebraska, and helps on his family-owned farm. Schilz and his wife, Deb, have two children.

State legislature
Schilz was elected in 2008 to represent the 47th Nebraska legislative district. He sat on the Agriculture, Business and Labor, and Natural Resources committees. He proposed LB640, an act relating to the Nebraska Advantage Act that amends certain sections of the advantage act to allow cities an option on whether local option sales and use tax is refundable. He also proposed LB101, an act to opt Nebraska out of Daylight Saving Time, claiming that it will simplify life in the Nebraska Panhandle.

See also

 Nebraska Legislature

References

External links
 

Living people
1969 births
Nebraska state senators
People from Ogallala, Nebraska
21st-century American politicians